Dravograd railway station is a railway station in Dravograd, Slovenia. It is located on the main Drautalbahn railway line between Maribor, Slovenia and Villach, Austria. The line towards Villach has not been operational since 1965. Currently, the only operational passenger line through this station is Maribor-Prevalje. In the past, Dravograd was an important railway crossing and there was also a line Dravograd - Velenje, which was abolished in 1968.

External links 

Official site of the Slovenian railways 
Virtual panorama. Burger.si.

Railway stations in Slovenia
Dravograd